Madame Bovary is an opera by Emmanuel Bondeville premiered at the Opéra-Comique on 1 June 1951 in a production by Louis Musy, conducted by Albert Wolff, with Jacqueline Brumaire in the title role The opera is based upon the novel Madame Bovary by Gustave Flaubert.

Recordings
Andree Esposito, Julien Haas, Yves Bisson, Nadine Denize, Orchestre de la Radio Lyrique de Paris, Pierre-Michel Le Conte 1962

References

External links
Opera chic John Adams on Madame Bovary

Operas based on works by Gustave Flaubert
Operas
Operas based on novels
French-language operas
Opera world premieres at the Opéra-Comique
1951 operas